is a 2006 Japanese comedy film written and directed by  Yoshimitsu Morita, based on a novel by Kaori Ekuni. The film's theme, Hey, brother, was performed by Rip Slyme.

Plot
The film follows two thirty-something eccentric brothers (Akinobu and Tetsunobu), who are also each other's best friends. Their mundane lives change when sisters Naomi and Yumi accept their invitations to a party and the brothers have to decide if they are ready to exchange their happy existence for the vicissitudes of love.

Cast
 Kuranosuke Sasaki as Akinobu Mamiya
 Muga Tsukaji as Tetsunobu Mamiya
 Miyuki Nakajima as Junko Mamiya
 Takako Tokiwa as Yoriko Kuzuhara
 Erika Sawajiri as Naomi Honma
 Keiko Kitagawa as Yumi Honma
 Hiromi Iwasaki as Miyoko Anzai
 Ryūta Satō as Kota

References

External links
 

2006 films
Films directed by Yoshimitsu Morita
Japanese comedy films
Kadokawa Dwango franchises
2000s Japanese-language films
2006 comedy films
Kadokawa Daiei Studio films
Films scored by Michiru Ōshima
2000s Japanese films